The  is a Japanese dialect spoken in western Aomori Prefecture.

The Tsugaru dialect is reputed to be so divergent from standard Japanese for those who are not native speakers, that even people living in the same prefecture may have trouble understanding it. In 1988, fans of the Tsugaru dialect proclaimed October 23 to be . October 23 is the anniversary of the death of Kyōzō Takagi (:ja:高木恭造), a famous poet who wrote in the Tsugaru dialect.

In Tsuruta, there is an annual summer  in which teams of foreigners create short skits or performances, usually humorous, using the dialect.  In June 2009, a short segment featuring the competition was broadcast nationally on NHK.

Examples 
The words are sometimes very different from those of standard Japanese.

Notes

References

External links
  Tsugaru Dialect Day
  Tsugaru-ben dictionary
  Suzumeko (Aozora Bunko) - a Tsugaru-ben short novel by Osamu Dazai
 
 
  (Permanently removed)
 

Japanese dialects
Culture in Aomori Prefecture